The 2022–23 Belgian Division 2 is the seventh season of the division in its current format, placed at the fourth-tier of football in Belgium.

With respect to the previous season, the most important change is the inclusion of U23 teams, with all three divisions seeing two teams enter and increase the size from 16 to 18 teams as a result. As before, leagues VV A and VV B consist of teams with a license from the Voetbalfederatie Vlaanderen (VV, the Flemish/Dutch speaking wing of the Belgian FA), while the ACFF league contains teams with a license from the Association des Clubs Francophones de Football (ACFF, the French-speaking wing of the RBFA). The champions from each of the three leagues will be promoted to the 2023–24 Belgian National Division 1.

Team changes

In
 Promoted from the 2021–22 Belgian Division 3 were champions Oostkamp (VV A), Racing Mechelen (VV B), Union Namur (ACFF A) and Dison (ACFF B).
 Six teams also gained promotion following wins in the promotion play-offs: Lebbeke, Torhout, Erpe-Mere United, Lille, Turnhout and Binche.
 Only one team was relegated from the 2021–22 Belgian National Division 1: La Louvière Centre.
 Six U23 teams were added to the league:
 Cercle Brugge and Zulte Waregem entered division VV A under the names of Jong Cercle and Jong Essevee.
 Beerschot and KV Mechelen started in division VV B as Beerschot U23 and Jong KV Mechelen.
 The ACFF division was completed with the U23 teams of Seraing and Union SG as respectively RFC Seraing U23 and Union SG B.

Out
 Previous seasons' champions Hoogstraten (VV B) and RAAL La Louvière (ACFF) were promoted, as well as VV A division runners-up Ninove (who took the place of Sparta Petegem which did not apply for a licence, necessary to get promoted).
 Relegated based on their finishing positions last season were Houtvenne and Wijgmaal from division VV B and Couvin-Mariembourg, Givry and Durbuy from the ACFF division.
 In division VV A, Zwevezele and Menen dropped down voluntarily to restart at lower levels, while Ronse folded as a team entirely with its matricule number scrapped, although de facto it merged into another team.

Belgian Division 2 VV A

League table

Belgian Division 2 VV B

League table

Belgian Division 2 ACFF

League table

Number of teams by provinces

References

Belgian Second Amateur Division
Bel
4
Current association football seasons